Insect traps are used to monitor or directly reduce populations of insects or other arthropods, by trapping individuals and killing them. They typically use food, visual lures, chemical attractants and pheromones as bait and are installed so that they do not injure other animals or humans or result in residues in foods or feeds. Visual lures use light, bright colors and shapes to attract pests. Chemical attractants or pheromones may attract only a specific sex. Insect traps are sometimes used in pest management programs instead of pesticides but are more often used to look at seasonal and distributional patterns of pest occurrence. This information may then be used in other pest management approaches.

The trap mechanism or bait can vary widely.  Flies and wasps are attracted by proteins. Mosquitoes and many other insects are attracted by bright colors, carbon dioxide, lactic acid, floral or fruity fragrances, warmth, moisture and pheromones. Synthetic attractants like methyl eugenol are very effective with tephritid flies.

Trap types 
Insect traps vary widely in shape, size, and construction, often reflecting the behavior or ecology of the target species. Some common varieties are described below

Light traps 
Light traps, with or without ultraviolet light, attract certain insects. Light sources may include fluorescent lamps, mercury-vapor lamps, black lights, or light-emitting diodes.
 Designs differ according to the behavior of the insects being targeted. Light traps are widely used to survey nocturnal moths. Total species richness and abundance of trapped moths may be influenced by several factors such as night temperature, humidity and lamp type. Grasshoppers and some beetles are attracted to lights at a long range but are repelled by it at short range. Farrow's light trap has a large base so that it captures insects that may otherwise fly away from regular light traps.  Light traps can attract flying and terrestrial insects, and lights may be combined with other methods described below.

Adhesive traps 
Sticky traps may be simple flat panels or enclosed structures, often baited, that ensnare insects with an adhesive substance. Baitless ones are nicknamed "blunder" traps, as pests might blunder into them while wandering or exploring.

Sticky traps are widely used in agricultural and indoor pest monitoring. Shelter traps, or artificial cover traps, take advantage of an insect's tendencies to seek shelter in loose bark, crevices, or other sheltered places. 
Baited shelter traps such "Roach Motels" and similar enclosures often have adhesive material inside to trap insects.

Flying insect traps 
These traps are designed to catch flying or wind-blown insects.

Flight interception traps or are net-like or transparent structures that impede flying insects and funnel them into collecting. Barrier traps consist of a simple vertical sheet or wall that channels insects down into collection containers. The Malaise trap, a more complex type, is a mesh tent-like trap that captures insects that tend to fly up rather than down when impeded.

Pan traps (also called water pan traps) are simple shallow dishes filled with a soapy water or a preservative and killing agent such as antifreeze. Pan traps are used to monitor aphids, wasps, and some other small insects. Pan traps are often yellow, but different colors including blue, white, red, and clear can be used to target different species.

Bucket traps and bottle traps, often supplemented with a funnel, are inexpensive versions that use a bait or attractant to lure insects into a bucket or bottle filled with soapy water or antifreeze. Many types of moth traps are bucket-type traps. Bottle traps are widely used, often used to sample wasp or pest beetle populations.

Terrestrial arthropod traps 

Pitfall traps are used for ground-foraging and flightless arthropods such as Carabid beetles and spiders. Pitfall traps consist of a bucket or container buried in soil or other substrate so that its lip is flush with the substrate.

A grain probe is a type of trap used to monitor pests of stored grain, consisting of a long cylindrical tube with multiple holes along its length that can be inserted at various depths within grain.

Soil emergence traps, consisting of an inverted cone or funnel with collecting jar on top, are employed to capture insects with a subterranean pupal stage. Emergence traps have been used to monitor important disease-vectors such as Phlebotomine sandflies.

Aquatic arthropod traps 
Aquatic interception traps typically involve mesh funnels or conical structures that guide insects into a jar or bottle for collecting.

Aquatic emergence traps are cage-like or tent-like structures used to capture aquatic insects such as chironomids, caddisflies, mosquitoes, and odonates upon their transition from aquatic nymphs to terrestrial adults. Aquatic emergence traps may be free floating on the water's surface, submerged, or attached to a post near shore.

See also
 Insect collecting
 Integrated pest management
 Biological pest control
 Insecticidal soap
 Organic farming

References

Further reading
Weinzierl, R., et al. Insect Attractants and Traps. ENY277. University of Florida IFAS. Published 1995. Revised 2005.
Kronkright, D. P. Insect Traps in Conservation Surveys. WAAC Newsletter January, 1991. 13(1) 21–23.

External links

Tereshkin, A. Devices for collecting wasps.

Animal trapping
Entomology equipment
Garden pests
Organic gardening
Sustainable agriculture